Marcelo Trabucco (born 11 April 1934) is an Argentine former freestyle swimmer. He competed in two events at the 1952 Summer Olympics.

References

External links
 

1934 births
Living people
Argentine male freestyle swimmers
Olympic swimmers of Argentina
Swimmers at the 1952 Summer Olympics
Swimmers from Buenos Aires